"Out of the Sinking" is a song by British singer-songwriter Paul Weller, released in 1994 as the first single from his third solo album, Stanley Road. Weller wrote the song and produced it with Brendan Lynch. The B-side to the single is a cover of the Beatles' "Sexy Sadie".

"Out of the Sinking" originally reached  20 on the UK Singles Chart upon release its release. In February 1996, it was re-released and reached a new peak of No. 16. The B-side to the single on the 1996 re-issue is a cover of Bob Dylan's "I Shall Be Released". According to Weller, he wrote "Out of the Sinking" as a "great English Mod love song" and took inspiration from the Small Faces.

Track listings
1994 version
 "Out of the Sinking"
 "Sexy Sadie"
 "Sunflower" (Lynch Mob dub)

1996 version
 "Out of the Sinking" (LP version)
 "I Shall Be Released"
 "Broken Stones"
 "Porcelain Gods"

Charts

Release history

References

1994 singles
1994 songs
1996 singles
Go! Discs singles
Song recordings produced by Brendan Lynch (music producer)
Songs written by Paul Weller